The enzyme prephenate dehydratase catalyzes the chemical reaction

prephenate  phenylpyruvate + H2O + CO2

This enzyme belongs to the family of lyases, specifically the hydro-lyases, which cleave carbon-oxygen bonds.  The systematic name of this enzyme class is prephenate hydro-lyase (decarboxylating; phenylpyruvate-forming). This enzyme is also called prephenate hydro-lyase (decarboxylating).  This enzyme participates in phenylalanine, tyrosine and tryptophan biosynthesis.

Structural studies

As of late 2007, only one structure has been solved for this class of enzymes, with the PDB accession code .

References

 
 
 

EC 4.2.1
Enzymes of known structure